Charles Irvin "Bubby" Rossman (born June 29, 1992) is an American-Israeli professional baseball pitcher who is a free agent. He played college baseball for Cerritos College and California State University, Dominguez Hills. He was selected in the 22nd round of the 2014 Major League Baseball draft by the Los Angeles Dodgers. He made his MLB debut at 30 years of age with the Philadelphia Phillies in July 2022. He pitched for the Israeli national baseball team in the 2023 World Baseball Classic.

Early life

Rossman was born in La Habra, California, to Charles (an actor) and Denyce Rossman, has a younger brother (Spencer), and is Jewish. He attended La Habra High School ('10), where he played baseball (batting .452 as a junior), football, and soccer (as the starting goalkeeper).

College
He then attended Cerritos College in California, where Rossman played baseball and as a freshman was named a 2nd team All Star. In his two seasons at Cerritos, while playing the outfield he batted .307/.446/.432 his freshman year, and .341/.459/.549 his sophomore year.

Rossman transferred, and next double-majored in business and kinesiology while attending NCAA Division II California State University, Dominguez Hills. Playing in 2014 in his senior season for the baseball team primarily in right field and as a designated hitter, he batted .261/.383/.455 while switch-hitting, and won a Division II West Region Rawlings Gold Glove Award in right field where he had 7 assists and played error-less defense; Kevin Pillar was a prior winner of the award for the school.  He also pitched 8.1 innings when the team ran low on pitchers, sporting a 92 mph fastball.

Professional career

Los Angeles Dodgers
Rossman was selected in the 22nd round of the 2014 Major League Baseball draft by the Los Angeles Dodgers, as a pitcher. While he "definitely did not want to be a pitcher ... I wanted to be an outfielder in the big leagues," and several teams were interested in him as an outfielder, the Dodgers insisted that he transition to pitcher. In 2014 as a relief pitcher for the Rookie league AZL Dodgers, he was 0-2 with one save and a 4.74 ERA in 19 innings, with 23 strikeouts. In 2015 with the Class A  Great Lakes Loons he was 3-1 with 4 saves and a 2.26 ERA in 51.2 innings over 29 games, in which he had 54 strikeouts. In 2016 pitching all but one inning for the Class A+ Rancho Cucamonga Quakes, he was 4-0 with a 3.43 ERA in 39.1 innings over 23 games, in which he had 34 strikeouts.

He was slow to recover from a triceps injury, which impeded his velocity. Rossman was released by the Dodgers in August 2016.

Independent leagues
Following his release, Rossman played in independent leagues for five seasons. In 2017 he pitched for the Sioux City Explorers of the American Association, in 2019 (during which time he became vegan) he pitched for Aguilas de Mexicali of the Arizona Fall League, Trois-Rivières Aigles of the Canadian-American Association, and the Cleburne Railroaders of the American Association, in 2020 he pitched for the Nerds Herd in the City of Champions Cup league, and in 2021 he played for the York Revolution in the Atlantic League. In his years in the independent leagues, he was 9-5 with four saves in 106 relief appearances, and averaged 11.5 strikeouts per 9 innings.

In 2021 Rossman played internationally, representing the Israel national baseball team in the 2021 European Baseball Championship, debuting with a win against Team Russia. He helped the team win a silver medal.

Philadelphia Phillies
Rossman was signed by the Philadelphia Phillies to a minor league contract prior to the beginning of the 2022 season, at which point he was throwing his fastball in the high 90s, and touching 99 mph, along with an 88 mph slider. He was assigned to the Double-A Reading Fightin Phils at the beginning of the season, and before he was called up he pitched in 27 games (including 8 starts; the first of his professional career), with a 3.32 ERA in 40.2 innings in which he struck out 48 batters.

Rossman was promoted to the Phillies major league roster on July 13, 2022. He made his MLB debut that day, at 30 years of age, after five years out of affiliated minor league baseball. Pitching the 8th inning that evening against the Toronto Blue Jays, he first walked a batter and gave up a home run to Teoscar Hernandez. He then retired the next three batters on only nine pitches, however, including a 98 mph four-seam fastball to strike out Matt Chapman. After the game, he was sent back to the minor leagues. In 2022, with Reading he was 2-2 with one save and a 3.02 ERA in 29 games (9 starts) in which he pitched 44.2 innings allowed 29 hits, and struck out 56 batters. With the Class AAA Lehigh Valley IronPigs he was 3=3 with a 6.04 ERA in 15 games (5 starts) in which he pitched 25.1 innings and struck out 27 batters. He elected free agency on November 10, 2022.

Team Israel

Rossman will play for Team Israel in the 2023 World Baseball Classic, to be held in Miami starting during March 11–15. He will be playing for Team Israel manager Ian Kinsler, and alongside two-time All Star outfielder Joc Pederson, starting pitcher Dean Kremer, and others.

See also
List of Jewish baseball players

References

External links

Cal State Dominguez Hills Toros bio
Instagram page
Bubby Rossman home page

1992 births
Living people
People from La Habra, California
Baseball players from California
Major League Baseball pitchers
Philadelphia Phillies players
Cerritos Falcons baseball players
Cal State Dominguez Hills Toros baseball players
Arizona League Dodgers players
Great Lakes Loons players
Rancho Cucamonga Quakes players
Sioux City Explorers players
Águilas de Mexicali players
Trois-Rivières Aigles players
Cleburne Railroaders players
York Revolution players
Reading Fightin Phils players
Israeli American
Israeli baseball players
Jewish American baseball players
Jewish Major League Baseball players
2023 World Baseball Classic players